is an action-maze video game originally developed and published by Hudson Soft for the PC Engine in Japan on 7 December 1990 and later in North America for the TurboGrafx-16 by NEC in 1991. Belonging to the Bomberman franchise, it is a re-imagining of the first game in the series starring White Bomberman on a quest to rescue Lisa, the kidnapped daughter of his inventor Dr. Mitsumori, from the castle of Black Bomberman while defeating evil monsters and villains that work for him. The game was later ported to home computers, each one featuring changes compared to the original version. Conversions for other platforms were in development but never released. The title garnered positive reception from critics since its initial release on the PC Engine/TurboGrafx-16 and later on home computers.

Gameplay

Single-player 
The single player game is divided into eight worlds, each one divided into eight stages. Each stage is presented as a maze of blocks filled with enemies. By using bombs, the player must destroy the blocks blocking their path and defeat all of the enemies. Once all of the enemies are defeated and the hidden exit is uncovered, the player can proceed to the next stage. Each stage also includes one power-up hidden under one of the blocks, which can increase the number of bombs drops, increase the range of the bombs' explosions, and other useful powers. The eighth stage in each world is a boss battle.

Multiplayer 
The game also includes a multi-player mode which allows up to five players to compete against one another (requires the use of a TurboGrafx-16 Multitap). This mode plays identically to the single-player mode, with the exception of power-ups being limited to only Bombs and Fire. There is also an alternate multi-player mode, Skull Mode, in which skulls sometimes appear hidden beneath blocks, which are detrimental if picked up.

Development and release 
Bomberman on the PC Engine/TurboGrafx-16 was created by most of the same team that would work on several projects such as later entries in the Bomberman series at Hudson Soft, with Tsukasa Kuwahara acting as sole designer. Atsuo Nagata and Yūji Muroya served as co-programmers, while Hideyuki Ogura and Mika Sasaki created the pixel art. The soundtrack was composed by Jun Chikuma, with Keita Hoshi also collaborating in its development at sound programmer. The game was first published in Japan by Hudson Soft on 7 December 1990 and later in North America by NEC in 1991. In Europe, Dyna Blaster was the name given to the European versions of Bomberman that came out in 1991. It's a replacement name that lacks the snap of the original.

Reception

PC Engine/TurboGrafx-16 

Bomberman on the PC Engine/TurboGrafx-16 garnered positive reception from critics since its release. Aktueller Software Markts Hans-Joachim Amann criticized the visuals but commended the sound and gameplay. Computer and Video Gamess Paul Glancey and Richard Leadbetter praised the visuals, music, gameplay and multiplayer. French magazine Génération 4 praised the animations and playability but criticized the visuals and sound. Hobby Consolas Marcos García commended the simple graphics, sound, gameplay and multiplayer aspect. Likewise, Jean-Marc Demoly of French publication Joystick praised the gameplay and multiplayer component. Both Martin Weidner and Stefan Hellert of German magazine Mega Fun gave the PC Engine original a positive outlook. Japanese readers of the magazine PC Engine Fan voted to give the game a 23.78 out of 10 score, ranking at the number 51 spot, indicating a large popular following. Bomberman on the TurboGrafx-16 was included in the 2010 book 1001 Video Games You Must Play Before You Die.

Dieter Kneffel of German magazine Play Time felt mixed in regards to the visuals and sound but praised the gameplay. Likewise, Olivier Scamps of French magazine Player One felt mixed about the graphics and sound but commended the gameplay and the ability to play against other players simultaneously. Heinrich Lenhardt of German publication Power Play was more critical of the visuals and sound, however he commended both gameplay and multiplayer positively. Raze noted that "Bomber Man is good in one player mode, but really come into its own with two or more players", stating that the magazine's staff played the multiplayer mode daily. Tilts Alain Huyghues-Lacour, however, gave the PC Engine original a mixed overall outlook. Michael Hengst of German outlet Video Games was more critical to the game in regards to several aspects but gave it a positive outlook regardless. VideoGames & Computer Entertainments Joshua Mandel commended the cartoony graphics and sound effects but criticized the single-player's short length.

Amiga 
The Amiga conversion of Bomberman received critical acclaim from reviewers. Amiga Actions Jason Simmons praised the graphics, sound and combination of puzzle and arcade elements, stating that "the simplest games are often the best and this is definitively the case with Dyna Blaster." Amiga Computings Daniel Whitehead praised the colorful graphics, sound design, gameplay and multiplayer, though Whitehead noted that "single players may feel a bit neglected, though." Amiga Formats Linda Barker commended the simple but colorful graphics, addictive gameplay and multiplayer, however Barker criticized the sound design. Amiga Manias Ashley Cotter-Cairns praised the fast gameplay, sound and graphics but criticized the longevity of the game, stating that "Dynablaster won't hold your attention for very long. But get some friends and a few four packs in and you're guaranteed a great evening's bombing." Amiga Powers Matt Bielby highly praised the multiplayer aspect, regarding it as a "PC Engine perfect conversion" but noted the title's high retail price due to the included multitap adapter.

CU Amigas Dan Slingsby praised the graphics, sound, longevity, playability and frantic multiplayer but admitted that the stages in single player mode eventually become boring. Likewise, Computer and Video Gamess Frank O'Connor commended the visuals, sound, playability and longevity as well as the multiplayer. Winfried Forster of German magazine Power Play was conflicted in regards to both graphics and sound but commended the gameplay and multiplayer component. Tilts Jacques Harbonn praised the visuals, animation, music, playability, longevity and multiplayer. Top Secrets Emilus gave the Amiga conversion a perfect score. Zeros Martin Pond commented positively about the visuals, sound, addictive gameplay and overall execution.

Other versions 
The X68000 version of Bomberman obtained critical acclaim from critics. Yoshida Kenji of Japanese magazine Oh!X praised the presentation and gameplay. Japanese publication Technopolis also praised the X68000 version highly.

The Atari ST port of Bomberman was also met with critical acclaim from reviewers. ST Actions Jason Dutton praised the visuals, sound, gameplay and multiplayer. Likewise, ST Formats Rob Mead commended the presentation, pacing, gameplay and multiplayer but criticized the controls for being unresponsive. ST Reviews Wayne Legg gave high remarks to the graphics, sound and playability, though he criticized the initial simplicity but regarded it as "one of the best games on the ST".

The MS-DOS release of Bomberman saw a mixed but positive reception from critics. Sébastien Hamon of French publication Joystick praised the ability to play against four players simultaneously, controls, visuals and sound. PC Gamess Oliver Menne criticized the sound and felt mixed in regards to the graphics but praised the gameplay and originality highly. Richard Löwenstein of German magazine PC Joker felt mixed about the port but rated it slightly higher than Kingsoft's Bug Bomber. German publication Play Time gave positive remarks to the sound, graphics and gameplay. Richard Eisenmenger of Power Play felt mixed about the visuals and sound but commended the multiplayer aspect.

Notes

References

External links 
 Bomberman at GameFAQs
 Bomberman at Giant Bomb
 Bomberman at MobyGames

1990 video games
Amiga games
Atari ST games
Bomberman
Cancelled Atari Lynx games
Cancelled Commodore 64 games
DOS games
Maze games
Multiplayer and single-player video games
X68000 games
SystemSoft Alpha games
TurboGrafx-16 games
Ubisoft games
Video games developed in Japan
Video games scored by Jun Chikuma